This is the order of battle for the 2019 Turkish offensive into north-eastern Syria, codenamed "Operation Peace Spring" by Turkey. The pro-Turkish forces, including the Syrian National Army, are opposed by the armed forces of the NES, including the Syrian Democratic Forces.

Turkey and allied forces 

Turkish Armed Forces
 Air Force
 Land Forces
1st Army
7th Commando Brigade
2nd Army
6th Corps
5th Armored Brigade
11th Commando Brigade
8th Corps
4th Commando Brigade
General Directorate of Security
Police Special Operation Department
National Intelligence Organization (MİT)

 Syrian Interim Government
Syrian National Army
First Legion
 Ahrar al-Sharqiya
Brigade 123
Badr Martyrs' Battalion
Sultan Suleyman Shah Brigade
1st Division
Division 14
Division 20 / Brigade 144
Second Legion
Hamza Division
Kurdish Falcons Brigade
 Sultan Murad Division
 Jaysh al-Islam
Men of War Brigade
Third Legion
Levant Front
Northern Storm Brigade
Glory Corps
Nour al-Din al-Zenki Movement remnants
Force 55
Fourth Legion
 Sham Legion
Fifth Legion
 Ahrar al-Sham
Jaysh al-Ahrar
Suqour al-Sham Brigades
Other SNA factions
Elite Army
Azadî Battalion
Anwar al-Hak Brigade
Mimati battalion
Army of Victory
Army of the East

SDF and allied forces 
 Rojava (Autonomous Administration of North and East Syria)
 Syrian Democratic Forces (SDF)
 People's Protection Units (YPG)
 Women's Protection Units (YPJ)
 Syriac Military Council (MFS)
Bethnahrain Women's Protection Forces
 Northern Democratic Brigade 
 Martyr Nubar Ozanyan Brigade
 Assyrian Forces
Khabour Guards
SDF military councils
 Serê Kaniyê Military Council
Liwa al-Tahrir
 Army of Revolutionaries‌
Kurdish Front
Thuwar Tal Abyad
Annaba Clan Volunteers
 Manbij Military Council
 Jarabulus Military Council
Tal Abyad Military Council
Qamishli Military Council
Raqqa Military Council
Hasakah Military Council
Al-Shaddadi Military Council
Military Discipline Units
 Rojava security forces
  Civilian Defense Force (HPC)
  Self-Defence Forces (HXP)
  Anti-Terror Forces (HAT)

 Syria
 Syrian Armed Forces

Manbij Front
Republican Guard
104th Brigade
106th Brigade
100th Artillery Regiment
1st Division
68th Brigade
282nd Battalion
Kobani Front
Republican Guard
30th Division
105th Brigade
1st Division
57th Brigade
846th Battalion
Border Guards
12th Regiment
Ain Issa/Raqqa Front  
5th Corps
5th Brigade
7th Brigade
3rd Battalion
148th Regiment
2nd Battalion
103rd Artillery
Republican Guard
104th Brigade
476th Battalion
Ras al-Ayn/Tel Tamar Front
17th Division
54th Regiment
23rd Battalion
79th Battalion
121st Artillery Regiment
123rd Artillery Regiment
3rd Division
20th Brigade
38th Battalion
10th Division
62nd Brigade
Northeast Hasakah Front
Border Guards
5th Regiment
Note: The pro-Syrian government National Defence Forces have an active branch in al-Hasakah Governorate, but have refused to fight alongside the SDF against Turkish-led forces. This is motivated by animosity of local NDF troops toward the SDF, as well as internal leadership disputes that have paralyzed al-Hasakah's NDF. In addition, the General Intelligence Branch 330 is known to be active in northern Syria.

Allied armed groups:

 International Freedom Battalion (IFB)
 Marxist–Leninist Communist Party (MLKP)
Martyr Serkan Battalion
 United Freedom Forces
 Marxist–Leninist Armed Propaganda Unit (MLSPB)
 Revolutionary Communard Party/United Freedom Forces (DKP/BÖG)
 Revolutionary Communard Party/Birlik (DKP/Birlik)
 Maoist Communist Party (MKP)
 Communist Party of Turkey/Marxist–Leninist (TKP-ML)
 Turkey Workers and Peasants Liberation Army (TİKKO)
 Communist Labour Party of Turkey/Leninist (TKEP/L)
 Tekoşîna Anarşîst

References

2019 Turkish offensive into north-eastern Syria